piouhgd is the fifth studio album by American alternative rock band Butthole Surfers, released in 1991 on Rough Trade Records. The album was reissued on Capitol Records in 1992, due to the album being out-of-print following the American branch of Rough Trade closing its doors the previous year. Capitol had bought the rights to the album after its initial release, in order to lure the Butthole Surfers away from other labels. The album was reissued yet again in October 2007 by Butthole Surfers' own label, Latino Buggerveil, and included the four songs from their 1989 EP Widowermaker as bonus tracks.

Title confusion
Rough Trade press releases stated that the album was pronounced "pee-owed" (as in "P.O.'ed", a euphemization of "pissed off") and that it meant "I told you" in the Navajo language. Bassist Jeff Pinkus stated that this explanation was fabricated by the label unbeknownst to the band, and that the album title was created with the intention of it being unpronounceable.

The album is spelled as "piouhgd" on original Rough Trade releases. On the 1992 Capitol Records reissue, the album title is printed on the spine as "pioughd". However, the original "piouhgd" spelling is still used on the back cover art of the Capitol release. The album has been referred to under both titles, as well as various misspellings.

Track listing
All songs written by Butthole Surfers, except where noted.

CD bonus track
 "Barking Dogs" – 7:28

2007 CD reissue bonus tracks
 "Helicopter" – 6:47
 "Bong Song" – 3:40
 "The Colored FBI Guy" – 2:46
 "Booze, Tobacco, Dope, Pussy, Cars" – 2:19

Tracks 14–17 from the Widowermaker EP.
 "The Hurdy Gurdy Man" is a cover of the 1968 Donovan song Hurdy Gurdy Man.
 "Something" sets the lyrics of the band's early 80's original song of the same name to the music and arrangement of The Jesus and Mary Chain's "Never Understand."

Personnel

 Gibby Haynes  – vocals, guitar
 Paul Leary  – guitar, keyboard, vocals (Tracks 3, 5, 10, & 13)
 Jeff Pinkus  – bass
 King Coffey  – drums

Notes 

1991 albums
Butthole Surfers albums
Capitol Records albums
Rough Trade Records albums